Live at Raji's is a live album and by Los Angeles band The Dream Syndicate.

Background
Containing songs from throughout the band's career, it is the last album released before the band broke up, and came out as a double album on the heels of their last studio album, Ghost Stories. The album was incorrectly reported to have been recorded after Ghost Stories; in fact, the recordings were made (straight to digital 2-track) on 31 January 1988, before Ghost Stories was recorded. The show took place at Raji's, a Los Angeles club, "in front of a delirious hometown audience".

The album was produced by Elliot Mazer, and was re-released in an expanded edition, with the original running order, in 2004. This re-release was reviewed in No Depression, the reviewer praising "Cutler's jagged, eight-legged leads" and compared the album to Neil Young's Live Rust and Warren Zevon's Stand in the Fire; "Rajis is the Syndicate's Television-meets-the-Velvet-Underground sound pushed as far as it would go. It was also the end of an era."

Track listing

Original 1989 edition
"Still Holding on to You" (Steve Wynn) - 4:15
"Forest for the Trees" (Steve Wynn) - 4:25
"Until Lately" (Steve Wynn) - 7:09
"That's What You Always Say" (Steve Wynn) - 4:47
"Burn" (Steve Wynn) - 5:52
"Merrittville" (Steve Wynn) - 7:46
"The Days of Wine and Roses" (Steve Wynn) - 8:22
"The Medicine Show" (Steve Wynn) - 8:51
""Halloween" (Karl Precoda) - 6:55
"Boston" (Steve Wynn) - 7:35
"John Coltrane Stereo Blues" (Karl Precoda, David Provost, Kendra Smith, Steve Wynn) - 12:11

2004 edition

Disc 1
"See That My Grave Is Kept Clean" (Blind Lemon Jefferson) - 4:53
"Still Holding on to You" (Steve Wynn) - 4:15
"Forest for the Trees" (Steve Wynn) - 4:25
"Until Lately" (Steve Wynn) - 7:09
"That's What You Always Say" (Steve Wynn) - 4:47
"When You Smile" (Steve Wynn) - 3:44
"Burn" (Steve Wynn) - 5:52
"All Along the Watchtower" (Bob Dylan) - 2:39
"Tell Me When It's Over" (Steve Wynn) - 3:52

Disc 2
"Merrittville" (Steve Wynn) - 7:46
"The Days of Wine and Roses" (Steve Wynn) - 8:22
"The Medicine Show" (Steve Wynn) - 8:51
"Halloween" (Karl Precoda) - 6:55
"Boston" (Steve Wynn) - 7:35
"John Coltrane Stereo Blues" (Karl Precoda, David Provost, Kendra Smith, Steve Wynn) - 12:11

Personnel
Steve Wynn - vocals, guitar
Paul B. Cutler - lead guitar
Mark Walton - bass
Dennis Duck - drums
Peter Case - harmonica and noise ("John Coltrane Stereo Blues")

Production
Elliot Mazer - production
Steve McDonald - recording engineer
Carlo Nuccio - house engineer
Debbie Ashby - house assistant
Pat Thomas - reissue production
Jeff Lipton - reissue mastering

References

1989 live albums
The Dream Syndicate live albums
Albums produced by Elliot Mazer